Henican is a surname. Notable people with the surname include:

 C. Ellis Henican (1905–1997), American lawyer and athlete 
 Ellis Henican (born 1958), American journalist